Anton Ginsburg (18 September 1930 – 19 July 2002) was a Russian pianist. He was born in Moscow. A disciple of Heinrich Neuhaus, he graduated from the Moscow Conservatory in 1953. Four years later he won the Smetana Competition in Prague. Ginsburg has been active as a concert pianist both in the USSR and abroad, but is best remembered for his work as an accompanist with Daniil Shafran.

References
 Classicus.jp (on Melodiya LP notes)
 Anton Ginsburg's grave

External links
  of Dmitri Shostakovich's Cello Sonata's Finale.

1930 births
2002 deaths
Russian classical pianists
Male classical pianists
Musicians from Moscow
Soviet classical pianists
20th-century classical pianists
20th-century classical musicians
20th-century Russian male musicians